The following outline is provided as an overview of and topical guide to Estonia:

Estonia – state of 1.29 million people in the Baltic region of Northern Europe. It is bordered to the north by the Gulf of Finland, to the west by the Baltic Sea, to the south by Latvia (343 km), and to the east by Lake Peipus and Russia (338.6 km). Across the Baltic Sea lies Sweden in the west and Finland in the north. The Estonians are a Balto-Finnic people, and the official language, Estonian, is a Balto-Finnic language closely related to Finnish and distantly to Hungarian.

General reference

 Pronunciation: 
 Common English country name: Estonia
 Official English country name: The Republic of Estonia
 Common endonym(s): Eesti, Eestimaa
 Official endonym(s): Eesti Vabariik
 Adjectival(s): Estonian
 Demonym(s): Estonians
 Etymology: Name of Estonia
 International rankings of Estonia
 ISO country codes: EE, EST, 233
 ISO region codes: See ISO 3166-2:EE
 Internet country code top-level domain: .ee

Geography of Estonia 

Geography of Estonia
 Estonia is: a country
 Location:
 Northern Hemisphere and Eastern Hemisphere
 Eurasia
 Europe
 Northern Europe
 Eastern Europe
 Time zone:  Eastern European Time (UTC+02), Eastern European Summer Time (UTC+03)
 Extreme points of Estonia
 High:  Suur Munamägi 
 Low:  Baltic Sea 0 m
 Land boundaries:  633 km
 343 km
 290 km
 Coastline:  Baltic Sea 3,794 km
 Population of Estonia: 1,340,600 (January 1, 2008)  - 152nd most populous country

 Area of Estonia: 45,228 km2
 Atlas of Estonia

Environment of Estonia 

 Climate of Estonia
 Renewable energy in Estonia
 Geology of Estonia
 Protected areas of Estonia
 National parks of Estonia
 Fauna of Estonia
 Birds of Estonia
 Mammals of Estonia

Natural geographic features of Estonia 
 Glaciers of Estonia — none
 Islands of Estonia
 Lakes of Estonia
 Mountains of Estonia
 Volcanoes in Estonia — none
 Rivers of Estonia
 Waterfalls of Estonia
 Valleys of Estonia
 World Heritage Sites in Estonia

Regions of Estonia

Administrative divisions of Estonia 

Administrative divisions of Estonia
 Counties of Estonia
 Municipalities of Estonia

Counties of Estonia 

Counties of Estonia

Municipalities of Estonia 

Municipalities of Estonia
 Capital of Estonia: Tallinn
 Cities of Estonia

Demography of Estonia 

Demographics of Estonia

Government and politics of Estonia 

Politics of Estonia
 Form of government: parliamentary representative democratic republic
 Capital of Estonia: Tallinn
 Elections in Estonia
 Political parties in Estonia
 Taxation in Estonia

Branches of the government of Estonia 

Government of Estonia

Executive branch of the government of Estonia 
 Head of state: President of Estonia, Toomas Hendrik Ilves
 Head of government: Prime Minister of Estonia, Taavi Rõivas
 Cabinet of Estonia

Legislative branch of the government of Estonia 

 Parliament of Estonia

Judicial branch of the government of Estonia 

Court system of Estonia
 Supreme Court of Estonia

Foreign relations of Estonia 

Foreign relations of Estonia
 Diplomatic missions in Estonia
 Diplomatic missions of Estonia

International organization membership 
The Republic of Estonia is a member of:

Australia Group
Baltic Assembly (BA)
Bank for International Settlements (BIS)
Council of Europe (CE)
Council of the Baltic Sea States (CBSS)
Euro-Atlantic Partnership Council (EAPC)
European Bank for Reconstruction and Development (EBRD)
European Investment Bank (EIB)
European Union (EU)
Food and Agriculture Organization (FAO)
International Atomic Energy Agency (IAEA)
International Bank for Reconstruction and Development (IBRD)
International Civil Aviation Organization (ICAO)
International Criminal Court (ICCt)
International Criminal Police Organization (Interpol)
International Development Association (IDA)
International Federation of Red Cross and Red Crescent Societies (IFRCS)
International Finance Corporation (IFC)
International Hydrographic Organization (IHO)
International Labour Organization (ILO)
International Maritime Organization (IMO)
International Monetary Fund (IMF)
International Olympic Committee (IOC)
International Organization for Migration (IOM)
International Organization for Standardization (ISO) (correspondent)
International Red Cross and Red Crescent Movement (ICRM)
International Telecommunication Union (ITU)

International Trade Union Confederation (ITUC)
Inter-Parliamentary Union (IPU)
Multilateral Investment Guarantee Agency (MIGA)
Nordic Investment Bank (NIB)
North Atlantic Treaty Organization (NATO)
Nuclear Suppliers Group (NSG)
Organisation for Economic Co-operation and Development (OECD) (accession state)
Organization for Security and Cooperation in Europe (OSCE)
Organisation for the Prohibition of Chemical Weapons (OPCW)
Organization of American States (OAS) (observer)
Permanent Court of Arbitration (PCA)
Schengen Convention
United Nations (UN)
United Nations Conference on Trade and Development (UNCTAD)
United Nations Educational, Scientific, and Cultural Organization (UNESCO)
United Nations High Commissioner for Refugees (UNHCR)
United Nations Institute for Training and Research (UNITAR)
United Nations Truce Supervision Organization (UNTSO)
Universal Postal Union (UPU)
Western European Union (WEU) (associate partner)
World Customs Organization (WCO)
World Federation of Trade Unions (WFTU)
World Health Organization (WHO)
World Intellectual Property Organization (WIPO)
World Meteorological Organization (WMO)
World Trade Organization (WTO)
World Veterans Federation

Law and order in Estonia 

Law of Estonia
 Capital punishment in Estonia
 Constitution of Estonia
 Crime in Estonia
 Human rights in Estonia
 LGBT rights in Estonia
 Freedom of religion in Estonia
 Law enforcement in Estonia

Military of Estonia 

Military of Estonia
 Command
 Commander-in-chief: Lieutenant General Ants Laaneots
 Ministry of Defence of Estonia
 Forces
 Army of Estonia
 Navy of Estonia
 Air Force of Estonia
 Special forces of Estonia
 Military history of Estonia
 Military ranks of Estonia

Local government in Estonia 

Local government in Estonia

History of Estonia 

History of Estonia
Timeline of the history of Estonia
 Military history of Estonia

Culture of Estonia 

Culture of Estonia
 Architecture of Estonia
Estonian vernacular architecture
 Cuisine of Estonia
Estonian Jews
Estonian Swedes
Estonian Russians
Baltic Germans
 Festivals in Estonia
 Languages of Estonia
 Media in Estonia
 Museums in Estonia
 National symbols of Estonia
 Coat of arms of Estonia
 Flag of Estonia
 National anthem of Estonia
 People of Estonia
 Prostitution in Estonia
 Public holidays in Estonia
 Religion in Estonia
 Christianity in Estonia
Estonian Evangelical Lutheran Church
Roman Catholicism in Estonia
Estonian Apostolic Orthodox Church
Estonian Orthodox Church of Moscow Patriarchate
 Hinduism in Estonia
 Islam in Estonia
 Judaism in Estonia
 Sikhism in Estonia
 World Heritage Sites in Estonia

Art in Estonia 
 Art in Estonia
 Cinema of Estonia
 Literature of Estonia
 Music of Estonia
 Television in Estonia
 Theatre in Estonia

Sport in Estonia 

Sport in Estonia
 Football in Estonia
 Estonia at the Olympics

Economy and infrastructure of Estonia 

Economy of Estonia
 Economic rank, by nominal GDP (2007): 90th (ninetieth)
 Agriculture in Estonia
 Banking in Estonia
 National Bank of Estonia
 Communications in Estonia
 Internet in Estonia
 Companies of Estonia
Currency of Estonia: Euro
ISO 4217: EUR
 Energy in Estonia
 Energy policy of Estonia
 Oil industry in Estonia
 Health care in Estonia
 Estonia Stock Exchange
 Mining in Estonia
 Tourism in Estonia
 Transport in Estonia
 Airports in Estonia
 Rail transport in Estonia
 Roads in Estonia

Education in Estonia 

Education in Estonia

See also 

Estonia

Index of Estonia-related articles
List of Estonia-related topics
List of international rankings
Member state of the European Union
Member state of the North Atlantic Treaty Organization
Member state of the United Nations
Outline of Europe
Outline of geography

References

External links

 Official gateway to Estonia
 Official Estonian Portal
 Encyclopedia Estonica
 Tourism portal

Estonia